Night Train Murders, also released in English-speaking countries as Last Stop on the Night Train and Late Night Trains, is a 1975 Italian revenge horror film directed by Aldo Lado and starring Flavio Bucci, Macha Méril, and Irene Miracle.

Based on the plots of Ingmar Bergman's The Virgin Spring (1960) and Wes Craven's The Last House on the Left (1972), the film follows two girls riding a train through Germany on Christmas Eve, who are brutalized by three criminals who eventually end up lodging in their parents' home.

It gained notoriety when it was banned in the UK as a video nasty in the 1980s. Other alternate release titles include The New House on The Left, Second House on The Left, and Don't Ride on Late Night Trains.

Plot
Two young women, Margaret and Lisa, are set to take the overnight train from Munich in Germany to stay with Lisa's parents in Italy for Christmas. They find the train is full and are forced to sit in the corridor. Meanwhile, two petty criminals, Blackie and Curly, also board the train as it is leaving Munich to escape from a pursuing policeman. The two thugs come across Margaret and Lisa, who help them hide from the ticket collector. Blackie then encounters an upper-class blonde older woman whom he attempts to molest in the toilets, only for her to seduce him aggressively. As Curly gets into a fight, the girls become increasingly wary of the two thugs' behaviour and make their way further down the train to escape them.

Arriving in Innsbruck in Austria, the train is stopped and searched following a tip-off that a bomb is on board. The girls decide to call Lisa's parents to tell them of the delay but can't get through. Meanwhile, in Italy, her parents are preparing for Christmas and hosting a dinner party for their friends, where Lisa's father, a doctor, decries the growing violence in society. Back in Innsbruck, the girls board a different train which will take them directly to their destination. However, upon boarding the new train, they find it is old, run-down, and virtually empty. Finding a compartment in the last carriage, they settle down for their trip, happy to have seats at last, and begin to eat a packed lunch by candlelight.

As the train travels into the night, the girls are alarmed to discover that the two thugs and the blonde woman are on board as well, and the three soon force their way into the girls' compartment. Blackie and the blonde then engage in various lewd acts while taunting the girls. Curly beats Margaret into submission and then forces Lisa to masturbate him. The blonde woman spots another passenger, a peeping tom watching them through the compartment window. Grabbing the man, the two thugs force him to rape Margaret, but they are distracted by Lisa vomiting, and he escapes.

The blonde encourages Curly to rape Lisa, but he is unable to break her hymen. Although Blackie is growing concerned about how events are heading, the blonde holds down Lisa while encouraging Curly to cut her with his flick knife to help him. The blonde enthusiastically grabs the knife and forces it deeper into Lisa, causing her to hemorrhage and die. Margaret escapes and manages to lock herself in the toilet while the blonde orders the two thugs to bring her back; the blonde initially thinks Lisa is feigning death and slaps her body until realizing she is deceased. Frantic, Margaret climbs out the window and flings herself from the train, only to be killed in the fall. The men throw Lisa's body out the window, followed by their victims' luggage, stealing their tickets and other items.

Arriving at the station to meet the girls, Lisa's parents are alarmed when they don't arrive. The stationmaster tells them that their train has been delayed, so the doctor and his wife elect to return home. As they are leaving, they come across the blonde and two thugs; Giulio agrees to take the three to his house so he can treat an injury the blonde woman sustained on her leg. Lisa's mother becomes suspicious of her houseguests when she spies Curly wearing a tie exactly like the one she was told Lisa had bought for her father as a Christmas present. The trio continue to act suspiciously, and Giulio elects to take them back to town and goes to fetch the car. While in the car, he hears a radio report naming his daughter as a body found near the train track.

Realizing his houseguests are responsible, Giulio confronts the blonde outside, but she convinces him the two thugs had killed the girls and had threatened to do the same to her. Believing her, Giulio leaves her with his wife before heading off to find the others. He discovers Curly in his surgery room injecting heroin; he grabs Curly and forces the needle deeper into his arm, overdosing him. He then repeatedly beats Curly with various furniture and surgical instruments.

Spying Blackie trying to flee, he grabs a shotgun and pursues him through the gardens. Curly manages to crawl into the driveway and tries to grab the blonde, only for her to kick him to death. Giulio wounds Blackie in the leg before shooting him at point-blank range. As the police arrive, the blonde woman's fate remains uncertain.

Cast
Flavio Bucci as Blackie
Macha Méril as Lady on the Train
Gianfranco De Grassi as Curly
Enrico Maria Salerno as Professor Giulio Stradi
Irene Miracle as Margaret Hoffenbach
Laura D'Angelo as Lisa Stradi
Marina Berti as Laura Stradi
Franco Fabrizi as Perverted Train Passenger
Dalila Di Lazzaro as Party Guest

Critical reception
Adam Tyner of DVD Talk wrote, "Night Train Murders has a few redeemingly uncomfortable moments that make the numerous comparisons to The Last House on the Left seem deserved. Still, it suffers from so many flaws—poor pacing, an anemic screenplay, weak overdubbed dialogue, and a tendency to flinch during the sparse brutality—that I can't recommend the movie on its own merits with any great enthusiasm."

DVD Verdict said, "If Wes Craven's train leaves Connecticut traveling east at 25 mph and Alan Lado's train leaves a station in Verona traveling west at 35 mph, then can a cheap imitation of a film actually be better than the film it's ripping off? Well, in this case yes. While The Last House on the Left's success came largely from its grittiness, Lado proves that a professional sheen can be just as effective, and puts his film on the express track to success."

Controversy
The film was rejected by the BBFC when submitted for cinema classification in the UK in 1976. It was banned as a video nasty in 1983, though it was acquitted and removed from the list in 1984. It did not get a full release until 2008 when it was finally passed uncut and distributed on DVD by Shameless Screen Entertainment.

See also
 List of Italian films of 1975

References

Notes

Sources

External links

1975 films
1975 horror films
Italian horror films
1970s Christmas films
1970s Italian-language films
Films directed by Aldo Lado
Films scored by Ennio Morricone
Rape and revenge films
Italian serial killer films
Films set on trains
Italian Christmas films
Films set in West Germany
Films set in Austria
1970s Christmas horror films
Video nasties
1970s Italian films